Arthur Stuart Ahluwalia Stronge Gilbert (25 October 1883 – 5 January 1969) was an English literary scholar and translator. Among his translations into English are works by Alexis de Tocqueville, Édouard Dujardin, André Malraux, Antoine de Saint-Exupéry, Georges Simenon, Jean Cocteau, Albert Camus, and Jean-Paul Sartre. He also assisted in the translation of James Joyce's Ulysses into French.

Life and career
He was born at Kelvedon Hatch, Essex, on 25 October 1883, the only son of a retired army officer, Arthur Stronge Gilbert, and Melvina, daughter of Randhir Singh,  the Raja of Kapurthala. He attended Cheltenham and Hertford College, Oxford, taking a first in Classical Moderations. He joined the Indian Civil Service in 1907 and, after military service in the First World War, served as a judge in Burma until 1925. He then retired, settling in France with his French-born wife Moune (née Douin). He remained there for the rest of his life, except for some time spent in exile in Wales during the Second World War.

Gilbert was one of the first Joycean scholars. He first read Ulysses while he was in Burma and admired it greatly. According to his wife, she and Gilbert were taking a walk in the Latin Quarter of Paris when they passed Shakespeare and Company, and saw some typescript pages of a French translation of Ulysses by Auguste Morel and Valery Larbaud displayed in the window. Gilbert noted several serious errors in the French rendering and introduced himself to Sylvia Beach, who was impressed by his criticisms of the translation. She took his name and telephone number, and suggested that Joyce, who was assisting in the translation, would contact him. This began many years of friendship between Joyce and Gilbert. He published James Joyce's Ulysses: A Study in 1930 (revised edition 1950); contributed an important chapter, "Prolegomena to Work in Progress," to Our Exagmination Round His Factification for Incamination of Work in Progress (1929), a collection of perspectives on the fragments of Joyce's "work in progress," later completed as Finnegans Wake (1939); and published a collection of Joyce's letters in 1957.

One of Gilbert's major projects was the translation from French of Roger Martin du Gard's novel sequence Les Thibault. Running to nearly 1,900 pages in translation, it was published by the Viking Press in the United States in two volumes, The Thibaults (1939) and Summer 1914 (1941).

Stuart Gilbert in the last decade of his life translated numerous texts for the Swiss art book publisher Albert Skira.

Legacy
At the Harry Ransom Humanities Research Center, at the University of Texas, there is a wealth of material on this intellectual, especially regarding his relationship with James Joyce and his work as a translator. This material includes correspondence, diaries, notebooks, press clippings and photographs, all coming from the period between 1900 and 1985.

Personal life
His parents were Major Arthur Stronge Gilbert (1839-1913) and Melvina Kundiher Singh (1860-1913), also known as "Melvina Kaur Sahiba (Princess Melvina Rundheer Singh Ahloowalia)". The latter was the daughter of Rajkumari Bibiji (née Henrietta Hodges and later Henrietta Melvina Oliver) (c. 1843-1893) and Sir Randhir Singh Sahib Bahadur (1831-1870), the raja of the princely state of Kapurthala in British India.

He married Marie Agnès Mathilde "Moune" Douin (died 19 May 1992), a French citizen and the co-author (with François Pujol,  Pierre Andrieu and Louis Audoubert) of Promenades et excursions dans les montagnes du Biros et du Castillonnais (1979).

They had one daughter, Madeleine Gilbert, who became a translator and whose published work included "Théâtre" by W.B. Yeats (Paris: Éditions Denoël, 1954; reprinted: Paris: Éditions Rombaldi, 1970 and Paris: Les Presses du compagnonnage, 1970.)

Gilbert died at his home at 7 rue Jean du Bellay, Paris on 5 January 5 1969.

Bibliography

Translations
 Antoine de Saint-Exupéry, Southern Mail (Courier-Sud), New York: Harrison Smith and Robert Haas, 1933. Translation of Saint-Exupéry's novel Courier sud (Paris: Gallimard, 1929).
 Jean Cocteau, Round the World Again in Eighty Days, London: George Routledge & Sons, 1937. Translation of Cocteau's journalistic work Mon Premier Voyage: Tour du Monde en 80 jours (Paris: Gallimard, 1936).
 Georges Simenon, In Two Latitudes, London: George Routledge & Sons, 1942 (contains "The Mystery of the Polarlys" and "Tropic Moon"). Translation of Simenon's novels Le Passager du Polarlys and Coup de Lune. 
 Albert Camus, The Outsider, London: Hamish Hamilton, 1946, introduction by Cyril Connolly; The Stranger, New York: Alfred A. Knopf, 1946. Translation of Camus's novel L'Étranger (Paris: Gallimard, 1942).
 Jean-Paul Sartre, No Exit (Huis Clos): A Play in One Act, &, The Flies (Les Mouches): A Play in Three Acts... English Versions by Stuart Gilbert, New York: Alfred A. Knopf, 1947. 
 André Malraux, The Psychology of Art, London: Zwemmer, 1949. Three volumes: 1. Museum Without Walls; 2. The Creative Act;  3. The Aftermath of the Absolute. 
 André Malraux, The Voices of Silence, New York: Doubleday, 1953; London: Secker & Warburg, 1954.
 André Malraux, The Metamorphosis of the Gods, London: Secker & Warburg, 1960- . Translation of Malraux's La Métamorphose des dieux (Paris: Gallimard, 1957).

Other works
 Reflections on James Joyce: Stuart Gilbert's Paris Journal, Austin, Texas: University of Texas Press, 1993. Edited by Thomas F. Staley and Randolph Lewis.

References

External links
 
 Translated Penguin Book - at  Penguin First Editions reference site of early first edition Penguin Books.

1883 births
1969 deaths
Alumni of Hertford College, Oxford
British Army personnel of World War I
English emigrants to France
English–French translators
English translators
French–English translators
Indian Civil Service (British India) officers
James Joyce scholars
20th-century British translators